Tilleman is a patronymic surname of Dutch origin from the personal name Til. Notable people with the surname include:

 Donald Tilleman (1919–1972), American mayor
 Karl Tilleman (born 1960), Canadian former basketball player
 Mike Tilleman (1944–2020), American football player

See also 
 
 Tillemann
 Tillemans

References 

Dutch-language surnames
Patronymic surnames